Ibrahim Bancé (born 15 January 2001) is a Burkinabé professional footballer who plays as a midfielder for Real Monarchs, on loan from ASEC Mimosas, and the Burkina Faso national team.

Professional career
On 10 July 2019, Bancé joined Swedish club Helsingborgs IF on a loan deal from ASEC Mimosas for the rest of 2019 with an option to buy. Bancé made his professional debut with Helsingborgs in a 5–0 Allsvenskan loss to IFK Norrköping on 25 August 2019. On 2 December 2019 it was confirmed, that Helsingborg had decided not to trigger his buying option and Bancé returned to ASEC with a total of seven first team games for the Swedish club.

On 29 March 2021, Bancé signed on loan with USL Championship, side Real Monarchs for their 2021 season.

International career
Bancé made his debut for the Burkina Faso national football team in a friendly 0–0 tie with the DR Congo on 9 June 2019.

References

External links
 
 

2001 births
Living people
Burkinabé footballers
Burkinabé expatriate footballers
Burkina Faso international footballers
Helsingborgs IF players
Allsvenskan players
Association football midfielders
Burkinabé expatriate sportspeople in Sweden
Expatriate footballers in Sweden
Real Monarchs players
Expatriate soccer players in the United States
21st-century Burkinabé people